Óscar Eduardo Córdoba Arce (born 3 February 1970) is a Colombian retired professional footballer who played as a goalkeeper. He played more than 70 games for the Colombia national team. He is also the only person to never concede a goal in a Copa América edition, having done so in 2001.

Club career
Córdoba started playing professionally with Atlético Nacional in 1988, but transferred to Deportivo Cali in 1989 and loaned to Deportes Quindío in 1990. In 1991, he moved to Millonarios, and in 1993 he played for Once Caldas, and América de Cali, with which he would win the Colombian Championship in 1997.

After the title, he moved to Argentine team Boca Juniors to what was probably his most successful time, winning the Argentine Championships Apertura 1998, Clausura 1999 and Apertura 2000, the Copa Libertadores 2000 and 2001, and the Intercontinental Cup of 2000. In 2000 and 2001 was part of the dream team of America.

Ready to make the jump to Europe, Córdoba moved to Italian Perugia Calcio, but after only half season he transferred to Turkish Beşiktaş Istanbul. In Turkey he often played against another Colombian goalkeeper of the Süper Lig; Faryd Mondragón of Galatasaray. After four seasons and after winning the 2002–03 Süper Lig and the 2005–06 Turkish Cup, he transferred to Antalyaspor, club in which he announced his retirement after the 2006–07 season. In spite of the announcement, he returned to Colombia and signed for Deportivo Cali to play the following season.

His contract with the Colombian side expired after Deportivo Cali were eliminated in the semi-finals of the Copa Mustang in the Apertura of 2008. In December 2008 he was nominated by the American channel Fox Sports as "Outstanding Career" Award given annually by such means the best athletes in the world. Oscar will be awarded with special recognition for Outstanding Career with Argentine striker Gabriel Batistuta.

After his experience at Deportivo Cali, Córdoba expressed his interest in either returning to Argentina, returning to Turkey, or retiring from football itself. He finally signed for Millonarios where he played until his retirement in December 2009. He won Fox Sports Radio's "Outstanding Career" Award with three other Colombians, including Formula 3 driver Gustavo Yacaman and bronze medal-winning Paralympic athlete Elkin Serna.

International career
Córdoba made his debut for the Colombia national team in a friendly against Costa Rica on 31 March 1993. He has gone on to make over 70 appearances for his country, making him the most capped goalkeeper in the history of Colombian international football.

In the 1994 FIFA World Cup qualification he started in every game and conceded only two goals making him the best goalkeeper in the playoffs. He played a key role in the 2001 Copa América, playing five of six games, and winning the tournament with no goals conceded. Along with Miguel Calero, the Colombian side kept their net virgin throughout the tournament, first time to ever happen in the Copa América. He also won the award for best goalkeeper in the tournament. He played in the 2003 FIFA Confederations Cup where Colombia came fourth.

On 10 September 2003, Córdoba surpassed René Higuita's record of 68 caps, to become Colombia's all-time record goalkeeper. He was called up to the Colombia national team for his final time in October 2009 as the third goalkeeper in a FIFA World Cup qualifier for the CONMEBOL.

Honours
América de Cali
 Categoría Primera A: 1996–97
 Copa Libertadores: runner-up 1996

Boca Juniors
 Argentine Primera División: 1998 Apertura, 1999 Clausura, 2000 Apertura
 Copa Libertadores: 2000, 2001
 Intercontinental Cup: 2000

Beşiktaş
 Süper Lig: 2002–03
 Turkish Cup: 2005–06

Colombia
 Copa América: 2001

Individual
 Most Valuable Player, 2000 Copa Libertadores
 Best Goalkeeper, 2000 and 2001 Copa Libertadores
 Best Goalkeeper, 2001 Copa América
 Named to the América dream team, 2000 and 2001
 First and only goalkeeper in Copa América history to keep a perfect clean sheet

References

External links

Óscar Córdoba Interview
Óscar Córdoba: the greatest 
Óscar Córdoba, from Maradona and his Ferrari Testarossa to football glory 

1970 births
Living people
Footballers from Cali
Colombian footballers
Association football goalkeepers
Atlético Nacional footballers
Deportivo Cali footballers
Deportes Quindío footballers
Once Caldas footballers
América de Cali footballers
Millonarios F.C. players
Boca Juniors footballers
Expatriate footballers in Argentina
A.C. Perugia Calcio players
Expatriate footballers in Italy
Beşiktaş J.K. footballers
Antalyaspor footballers
Expatriate footballers in Turkey
Colombian expatriate footballers
Colombia under-20 international footballers
Colombia international footballers
1994 FIFA World Cup players
1998 FIFA World Cup players
1993 Copa América players
1995 Copa América players
2001 Copa América players
2003 FIFA Confederations Cup players
Categoría Primera A players
Argentine Primera División players
Serie A players
Süper Lig players
Copa América-winning players
Copa Libertadores-winning players
Footballers at the 1995 Pan American Games
Pan American Games bronze medalists for Colombia
Pan American Games medalists in football
Medalists at the 1995 Pan American Games